Winnetou and Old Firehand is a 1966 western film directed by Alfred Vohrer and starring Pierre Brice, Rod Cameron, and Marie Versini.

It was made as a co-production between West Germany and Yugoslavia, as part of a series of Karl May adaptations made during the decade. It was not a box-office success and only one further film was made. The film was released by Bavaria Film in Germany, and by its parent company Columbia Pictures in the United States (under the title Thunder at the Border).

It was made at the Spandau Studios in Berlin and on location in Croatia. The film's sets were designed by the art director Vladimir Tadej.

Cast

References

Bibliography

External links 
 

1966 films
1966 Western (genre) films
German Western (genre) films
West German films
1960s German-language films
Films directed by Alfred Vohrer
Bavaria Film films
Columbia Pictures films
Films set in the 19th century
Films set in New Mexico
Films shot at Spandau Studios
Winnetou films
1960s German films
Foreign films set in the United States